The 2006 Borujerd earthquake occurred in the early morning of 31 March in the South of Borujerd with destruction in Borujerd, Silakhor and Dorood areas of the Loristan Province in western Iran. The centre of the earthquake was in Darb-e Astaneh village south of the Borujerd City. The earthquake measured 6.1 on the moment magnitude scale.

Earthquake 
This powerful earthquake shook the entire land of Loristan Province and most areas of Hamedan Province, Markazi Province and destroyed many villages in Khorramabad, Alashtar and Arak County as well. More than 180 aftershocks followed the main earthquake in April, May and June and people had to stay outside for several weeks.

A lighter foreshock happened the night before, and people stayed outside overnight and this reduced the number of casualties significantly. However, the mainshock at 4:47 am on 31 March shook Borujerd, Dorud and other towns and villages on Silakhor Plain for more than 55 seconds.

Damage 

More than 40 major historical monuments of Borujerd were destroyed by the earthquake and 30% of the historical downtown of the city (2.7 kmª) was ruined or damaged thoroughly. Other monuments damaged by the earthquake include:

 Jame Mosque of Borujerd (900 AD)
 Soltani Mosque of Borujerd
 Imamzadeh Ja'far, Borujerd
 Chalenchoolan Bridge
 Ghaleh Hatam Bridge
 Birjandi Old House of Borujerd
 Mesri Old House of Borujerd
 Imamzadeh Khalogh Ali
 Tekyeh Movassaghi
 Pahlavei High School

Response 
Apart from UN agencies e.g. UNESCO and UNICEF, there are other international agencies functioning in the field, including MSF, Caritas Italy, Operation Mercy, ACH Spain and ACT Netherlands.

See also
1909 Borujerd earthquake
List of earthquakes in 2006
List of earthquakes in Iran

References

External links 
 Darb e Astaneh (Silakhor) Earthquake Report: March 31, 2006; ML=6.1 – IIEES
 IFRC- Iran Doroud Earthquake, Information Bulletin no.3 – IFRC
 M 6.1 - western Iran – USGS
 
 

Borujerd earthquake
Borujerd earthquake
2006 Borujerd
History of Lorestan Province
Borujerd County
Borujerd
March 2006 events in Asia